Matt Mafi (born 26 May 1993) is an Australian rugby union hooker who currently plays for  in Australia's National Rugby Championship.   He has also previously represented Super Rugby side, the Queensland Reds.

Early/provincial career

Mafi was born in Sydney, but attended school in Brisbane at St Joseph's College, Nudgee.   He was picked to represent Queensland at schoolboy level in 2008 and played his early junior rugby with the Sunnybank rugby club.   He then moved back to Sydney to attend Sydney University where he played some Shute Shield rugby and also won the Colts Premiership with them in 2011.   After graduating university it was back to Queensland again this time to play in the local Queensland Premier Rugby competition with Brothers and later in the National Rugby Championship with Brisbane City with whom he was a champion in both 2014 and 2015.

Super Rugby career

After 2 successful seasons with Brisbane City, Mafi was called into the Reds Super Rugby squad during the 2016 Super Rugby season to provide injury cover for Saia Fainga'a.   In total, he made 4 substitute appearances during the campaign.

International

Mafi was an Australian Schoolboys representative in 2008.

Super Rugby statistics

References

1993 births
Living people
Australian rugby union players
Rugby union hookers
Brisbane City (rugby union) players
Queensland Reds players
Rugby union players from Sydney